96 is a 2018 Indian Tamil-language romantic drama film written and directed by C. Premkumar. Produced by S. Nanthagopal of Madras Enterprises, the film was distributed by Lalit Kumar under his banner Seven Screen Studio. Starring Trisha Krishnan and Vijay Sethupathi in lead roles, the film has Bagavathi Perumal, Devadarshini, Aadukalam Murugadoss and Shyam Prasad appear in supporting roles. The film revolves around the reunion of former students from the batch of 1996, twenty-two years after their graduation. The reunion also serves as an opportunity for two former lovers, Ram and Jaanu, to resolve issues surrounding their breakup.

Prem Kumar wrote the script during December 2015, at the period of Chennai floods and had completed the entire script within 20 days, which revolved around his life on high school reunion. After the official announcement, the principal photography of the film was commenced on 12 June 2017 at Kumbakonam, and was shot across various locations in Chennai and Pondicherry, while also being filmed in Andaman and Nicobar Islands, Kolkata, Rajasthan and Kullu–Manali. The cinematography was handled by Mahendiran Jayaraju and N. Shanmuga Sundaram, with editing being handled by R. Govindaraju. The music and background score is composed by Govind Vasantha.

96 was released worldwide on 4 October 2018. The film received critical acclaim from critics, praising the script, direction, cinematography, music and the nostalgic setting of the film, the performances of Sethupathi and Trisha. It was a commercial success, grossing . In addition, the film won six Norway Tamil Film Festival, five Filmfare, Ananda Vikatan, four SIIMA, Edison, Behindwoods awards each, and also won an Asiavision, Asianet and Vanitha film award for Trisha. The film was remade by Preetham Gubbi in Kannada as 99 (2019), and by Premkumar himself in Telugu as Jaanu (2020). The film was further listed as one of the "All Time 150 Cult Indian Films" by Behindwoods in March 2020.

Plot 

Ramachandran aka Ram is a travel photographer. He visits his high school and is overcome by memories. A reunion is arranged through their school WhatsApp group. At the reunion, his friends Murali, Subhashini and Sathish catch up with him. Murali hesitantly mentions that Janaki aka Jaanu (Ram's childhood love) is coming from Singapore.

In 1996, Ram and Jaanu have been friends and classmates in 10th grade. Jaanu is a talented singer. Ram develops feelings for Jaanu and she reciprocates. Once their board exams are over, they have a moment with each other where Jaanu asks him not to forget her until they meet again after the holidays.

Back in the present, Jaanu arrives at the reunion and searches for Ram. When Subha points Ram to her, Jaanu walks towards him. She reminisces the first day of 11th grade when she eagerly awaits Ram's arrival to the classroom, but he doesn't show up. She finds that Ram has left the school because his father had financial difficulties and his family relocated to Madras overnight. Jaanu is inconsolable and pines for Ram until she completes school.

Ram and Jaanu finally meet and find it uncomfortable to interact with each other, but gradually get along. Their friends talk about Jaanu's married life in Singapore and disclose that Ram is still single and hasn't moved on. After the reunion party, both go out on a drive. Jaanu reveals how she could not forget Ram and would have traded anything just to have met him once back then. She narrates how circumstances forced her to marry someone else. Then, Ram asks Jaanu if she really doesn't remember the day he came to her college to meet her. Ram says that he and Murali waited in front of Jaanu's college to meet her and passed on a message through a student. Surprisingly, Jaanu refused to meet Ram and forbade him to contact her again. He returned sadly and never tried to meet her since then. Jaanu is devastated after listening to this and reveals that she never saw them at her college and thought it was her stalker who was troubling her. Ram tells that except for the mistake of assuming that she hated him, he knew everything about her life. He also tells about seeing her from afar at her wedding. Jaanu is heartbroken because she felt his presence and expected him to come for her until the last minute. Both feel sad about their misfortune and finally, come to terms with everything that happened in their lives. Jaanu expresses her desire to spend the final few hours with Ram before she catches the flight back home.

They go out into the city and then to a restaurant and catch up on more memories. There, they meet Ram's photography students who assume Jaanu is his wife and request her to share their story. Jaanu obliges and narrates an improvised version of the time when Ram tried to meet Jaanu at her college. She tells about how they finally met and made up and have been together ever since and got married. Albeit feeling awkward, Ram tries his best to play along. The students leave and Ram asks Jaanu to visit his apartment as it is already late at night. On the way, they get drenched in the rain and Ram gives Jaanu some of his dry clothes.

At his apartment, Jaanu is visibly upset that Ram doesn't have a love life and requests him to move on and get married and have a family. She finally sings Ram's favourite song for him, a song that she had purposefully avoided singing in school in spite of his repeated requests. Ram shows Jaanu a collection of their old memories like love poems, dried flowers, and their school uniforms. They realize that time is running out and go back to Jaanu's hotel to get ready for her flight in a few hours. Jaanu is sad knowing that she'll leave Chennai and Ram very soon. At the airport, Ram escorts her to the boarding gate and they bid a teary farewell. Jaanu then gets into the flight and departs.

Back at his home, Ram finds Jaanu's clothes that he had put to dry the previous night. He folds them neatly, puts them along with his treasured collection of school memories, and shuts the suitcase and the screen cuts to black.

Cast

Production

Development 

In October 2016, it was first reported that Trisha had agreed to be part of a project opposite Vijay Sethupathi that was to be directed by cinematographer C. Prem Kumar, who worked with the latter in Naduvula Konjam Pakkatha Kaanom (2012). Two months later, Trisha announced the project via her Twitter and revealed the title as 96. Prem Kumar originally had Manju Warrier in mind for the role of Janaki, but he was not able to reach her and was replaced by Trisha. Furthermore, the film was considered to be a romantic thriller genre, but was later revealed to be a "light-hearted romance film revolving about the childhood sweethearts who rekindle their relationship at a school reunion gathering".

From May 2017, Prem Kumar first talked about the film, telling that Vijay Sethupathi would play the role of a travel photographer, and that the film revolved around "characters who belong to the same batch: 1996", revealing the meaning of the film's title. Prem Kumar had written the entire script in 20 days in December 2015 during the Chennai floods when he was stuck in his apartment. According to Prem Kumar, the inspiration for the story came from his high school reunion. He missed the reunion but when talking to his classmates who attended the function he became fascinated about two people they were speaking about and began meeting the two and developing a story around their characters. The film's story was originally supposed to happen over a week, before the time span was changed to 24 hours, and eventually to a night.

Casting 

The technical crew of the film includes N. Shanmuga Sundaram and Mahendran Jayaraju as the cinematographers, Govind Vasantha as the music director, R. Govindaraj as the editor, Vinoth Raj Kumar handling the production design and Uma Devi and Karthik Netha as the lyricists. Apart from the lead actors, Bagavathi Perumal, Devadarshini, Rajkumar, Aadukalam Murugadoss and Varsha Bollamma were roped in for supporting roles. Veteran actor Janagaraj made a comeback with this film, essaying the role of a school watchman. About his role, Kumar had said that "School watchmen, in general have child-like behaviour and innocence that schoolkids have. He wanted someone to have that naturally in him" and thought of Janagaraj in mind. After approaching Janagaraj in his home, he gave the script papers without taking much time to decide, he eventually agreed to be on board.

The crew was then looking for suitable actors to play the younger versions of Sethupathi and Trisha's characters, which delayed the commencement of principal photography. The team eventually selected Aditya Bhaskar, son of actor M. S. Bhaskar, and Gouri G. Kishan for the roles, both making their acting debuts with the film. Devadharshini's daughter, Niyathi Kadambi, played the younger version of her role. Subhashree Kaarthik Vijay, who was recruited as the costume signer, was a close friend of Prem Kumar and created the look of the lead female character Jaanu based on her own style. The team shot a scene where the lead characters meet singer S. Janaki, though this was later deleted from the film. Post-release, the makers uploaded the scene to YouTube.

Characters 
Vijay Sethupathi's character Ram, was a travel photographer. Discussing about his portrayal, Prem Kumar stated that his life was considered to be "inconsistent and nomadic and his thoughts were unsettling like his job". The character was also unable to forget his first love in childhood, even though she was married, which had Kumar referred of a "few men who have remained the same as they were in their teens". He also quashed rumours that the title 96 was not referred to Sethupathi, playing a 96-year-old man, unlike Orange Mittai (2015) and Seethakaathi (2018), where he played an aged person in the film. Initially, Kumar wanted to write the script under the perspective of Trisha's character Jaanu, as she had a significant role and also his idea of writing characters with his women in mind, felt that women are superior to men and have many layers in their life, apart from other male writers who write stories on a man's point of view.

The character also had a connection with music, since she had a rich and textured voice with that of singer S. Janaki. Kumar believed that in some ways or the other, the film serves as a tribute to the singer. Both the characters, along with the similar artists are in their mid-30s, where the "unusualness and experimentation stops after 25", however, the two characters were in abnormal situation, which excited Kumar to write the film. The common aim is to depict the emotion of love without boundaries, as Kumar stated that "There is a sort of imperative about how a man and woman should be. The same way, love too is regulated. But love comes out even in uncommon situations. Love is the purest form of expression. That is what we have underlined in the film."

Filming 

Principal photography of the film began production on 12 June 2017 at Chennai. After a brief schedule being completed, the team headed to Kumbakonam on 11 July, to shoot major portions of the film. Trisha, who was absent for the first shooting schedule of the film, joined the second schedule. The film was reported to be shot in 30 various locations, including Andaman and Nicobar Islands, Kolkata, Rajasthan, Kullu–Manali and Pondicherry, for the introductory song "Life of Ram", as the song is based on Sethupathi's life as a travel photographer. Portions of the song were shot at Jog Falls in Karnataka, and Spiti Valley in Himachal Pradesh. The team first headed to Pondicherry in August 2017, to shoot crucial sequences. It has been reported that Janagaraj had joined the shoot and filmed some portions in Kumbakonam, where the school featured in the film was shot at Town Higher Secondary School. The film was also shot at Intercontinental Chennai Mahabalipuram Resort, Accord Metropolitan Hotel, Chennai International Airport and also around T. Nagar, Nungambakkam and Kodambakkam. Despite being delayed due to the lead actor's commitments in other films, which led to intermittent schedule breaks and Tamil Film Producers Council strike over Virtual Print Fee hike, the film completed production in June 2018.

Soundtrack 
The soundtrack album and background score and were composed by violinist-turned-composer Govind Vasantha, for whom it was his third film he signed, and the second to get released, because of the delay of his maiden project Oru Pakka Kathai. Prem Kumar, who worked as a cinematographer in that film, recommended his name to work as the composer, as he had a close relationship with the director Balaji Tharaneetharan and worked with them in Naduvula Konjam Pakkatha Kaanom and Oru Pakka Kathai. The album had eight songs, with only five being included in the film and the lyrics were written by Karthik Netha and Uma Devi. The track "Kaathalae Kaathalae" was released as a single on 30 July 2018. It was earlier composed as an instrumental track, and later having vocals and lyrics, though it was meant not to be included in the film. However, after multiple requests from fans, ever since being featured in the first teaser of the film, he later worked on it as 3-minute track being included in the soundtrack as well as in the film. It is however, a short and slower-version of the promotional track "Anthaathi", which he had first composed.

On 24 August 2018, Think Music India released the full album through music platforms. The film's soundtrack album received positive response from music critics, with praise being directed on Govind's use of minimal instruments and only two playback singers (Pradeep Kumar and Chinmayi) rendering voice for most of the songs in the soundtrack. The production, instrumentation and the soundscape used in the film unlike mainstream Tamil film soundtracks, too received appreciation. Further being hailed by critics as "one of the best soundtracks of 2018", the soundtrack had fetched many accolades. Analysts believed that the songs, score and use of film music as a metaphor contributed to its success.

Release 
The concept logo of '96 was released on the occasion of Valentine's Day (14 February 2017). In August 2017, a new poster featuring Vijay Sethupathi was released and it was reported that the film would release on 14 February 2018, but that did not happen, due to the delay in production. The first look featuring Vijay Sethupathi and Trisha, was released on 12 July 2018, and on the same day, the makers unveiled the teaser of the film. The teaser received positive response from viewers and crossed 3 million views within 3 days of its release. On 24 August, coinciding with the film's audio launch, the makers unveiled the theatrical trailer of the film.

The film was initially slated to release on 13 September 2018, coinciding with the Hindu festival of Ganesh Chaturthi, but the release date was postponed to 4 October 2018, in order to avoid clash with big-budget films. Three days prior to the film's release, the film had a press screening for critics on 1 October 2018, where it received highly positive response. Lalit Kumar of Seven Screen Studios, who was an upcoming producer, then, had purchased the worldwide distribution rights. The theatrical rights of the film in Kerala were to sold to  crore. The film's Hindi dubbed version was released on YouTube by Goldmines Telefilms in 2019. It has been opened in 250 theatres worldwide.

Sun TV purchased the satellite rights of the film, even before the film's production in January 2018. A month after its release and the successful run, Sun TV had a television premiere during Diwali, on 6 November 2018. This has caused the public, including actress Trisha and director Prem Kumar requesting the channel to postpone the telecast. Despite that, the channel went ahead with the premiere. Post release, the makers unveiled few deleted scenes from the film, soon after its 50th day run. On 11 January 2019, the film completed its 100th day theatrical run, and to celebrate its success, Lalit Kumar hosted a success meet on 4 February 2019, with several noted celebrities along with the crew attended the event. A year after its release, Radio City aired the film in audio-format on 14 February 2020 (Valentine's Day), which was not done for a mainstream Tamil film.

Reception

Box office 
In the opening day of its release, the film had collected  at the Chennai city box office, and worldwide the film had earned . Within the second week of its release, more screens were allotted to the film following its positive word-of-mouth.

In Kerala, the number of screens were increased from 80 to 106 screens within the second week, despite other new films released on the week — Ratsasan, NOTA and another Sethupathi-starrer Chekka Chivantha Vaanam. It became Vijay Sethupathi's first solo hit in the state. The film also earned  from overseas centres.

Critical response 
The film received critical acclaim from critics and audience, praising the script, cinematography, direction and music and the performances of Sethupathi and Trisha. 96 appeared on many year-end lists as one of the best Tamil films of 2018, by top publications such as The Indian Express, HuffPost, The Hindu, The News Minute and The Week.

Anupama Subramaniam of Deccan Chronicle, who gave the film 3.5 stars out of 5, was in high praise of director Prem Kumar as she wrote that he had "not made a film, but woven pure and impeccable poetry on celluloid", going on to add that "Prem's honest attempt of portraying the true essence of love without taking any cinematic liberties makes 96 the kind of genre-defining film that creates a benchmark for many years to come", while hailing Trisha's performance as her "best-ever till date". A critic from the Indo-Asian News Service gave it a rare 5 stars out of 5 and said, "as we get to the climax and we get one of the most heartwarming moments of the film, it makes 96 a highly satisfying story of unfulfilled romance". Behindwoods called 96 a "breezy and heartwarming romantic tale that Tamil cinema audience shouldn't miss". Sify named it "one of the best films in a long time", while giving it a 4 rating out of 5. Janani K. of India Today gave it 4 stars out of 5 and called it a "poignant romantic tale" and a "tribute to unconditional love". Mythily Ramachandran of Gulf News called the film "a classic love story that will be fondly remembered".

Sreedhar Pillai of Firstpost called the film a "refreshingly fresh romantic trip down the memory lane with outstanding performances by its charming lead pair". M. Suganth of The Times of India gave it 3.5 stars out of 5 and said that "there is a lot to fall in love with 96, a wistful romantic film about a past romance [...] But what sets Prem Kumar's film apart from the others is that it gives equal importance to the romance of its female lead". Srinivasa Ramanujam of The Hindu said that the film "will take you on a nostalgic trip to your school days and old flames". Manoj Kumar R. of The Indian Express gave 3 out of 5 and praised Sethupathi's performance saying that the actor "sails through the film effortlessly in his role" and Trisha "also aced her performance as a married woman who can't stop indulging in emotional infidelity".

Vikram Venkatesen of The Quint wrote "96 has very well changed Tamil romance for good, thanks to its high dependence on music and realism in conveying nostalgia". Priyanka Thirumurthy of The News Minute wrote, "the film's screenplay is gripping. It has you on the edge of your seat for what are seemingly the most inane activities – school attendance, conversations over coffee and even a ride in the metro". Sudhir Srinivasan of The New Indian Express felt that 96 "works beautifully in theory [...] in the head. Long-lost lovers fitting together again — like two pieces in a jigsaw puzzle — just for an evening, after more than a decade, is a dreamy idea. But that's the effect of the film too." Baradwaj Rangan of Film Companion South wrote, "The only problem is the slump in the second half [...] But the premise is so affecting, it keeps us invested" and concluded, "I walked out of the film satisfied that whatever Ram and Janaki decide to make of their future, his ink-splattered shirt from school and the dupatta of her uniform will live together, happily ever after".

Accolades

Controversies

Plagiarism allegations 
In late October 2018, a month after96s release, Suresh, an assistant director of Bharathiraja, alleged that he had written a script called 92 and that '96 was based on his own script. Few days later Prem Kumar hosted a press conference and said that he had registered his script in 2016 and also added that he had written a spin-off novel of what happens to the lead character afterwards. The film was also reported to have "uncanny similarities" with Blue Jay (2016), with Prem Kumar admitting to it, although he added that he had already registered his film before Blue Jay released. Director R. Chandru had accused that the movie had similarities with his film Charminar (2013).

Cancellation of morning shows 
On the day of its release, the film's early morning shows scheduled for 6:00 a.m. has been cancelled during the last minute, leading to disappointments within the audience. It has been reported that the stalling of the morning shows is due to the financial tussles between Vishal, an erstwhile president of Tamil Film Producers Council (TFPC) and producer S. Nanthagopal, and had described in an audio note saying that he had stopped the release. A project starring Vishal and Nanthagopal did not materialize, and the producer failed to repay the funds, that both of them had arranged, the amount was under the tune of  crore. A tripartite agreement signed between the producer and actor was signed in front of the TFPC members, with one of them stated that the funds will be repaid before the release of '96, but as Nanthagopal failed to repay the funds before its release, the makers stalled the film, leading to its first show being cancelled. Following the issue, the lead actor Vijay Sethupathi decided to withdraw his salary being offered for the film. However, despite the smooth release and the theatrical run, in November 2018, Nadigar Sangam had banned producer Nanthagopal, and also advised the artists not to work with any of the projects produced by the company, over this issue.

Legacy 
Bengaluru-based Tamil writer C. Saravanakarthikeyan wrote a book based on the film titled 96 – Thanipperum Kadhal, which was released by Prem Kumar by late December 2018. Inspired by the film, Gulbonda, a Calicut-based art studio created dolls based on the film's two main characters, Ram and Jaanu, which became sought-after by fans and saved the then newly launched startup company. The yellow kurta outfit worn by Trisha's character Jaanu became popular after the film's release and was sold by a textile store in Chennai. A year after the film's release, the poster designer Gopi Prasanna designed an illustrated poster featuring the lead characters walking on the road, similar to the first look poster.

The film's commercial success, also led Lalit Kumar's Seven Screen Studios becoming one of the leading film studio companies in Tamil film industry. At the 100th day celebrations of the film held in Chennai in February 2019, the company announced, another film with Sethupathi, which was titled Tughlaq Durbar and later on Kaathu Vaakula Rendu Kaadhal. In addition, the film also acquired the rights of the Vijay-starrer Master, which had Sethupathi playing the antagonist. Gouri G. Kishan and Varsha Bollamma, who appeared in pivotal roles in the film gained popularity and later went on to be a part of big-budget films. The Tamil film Mudhal Nee Mudivum Nee (2022) had connections with the premise of '96 which was reviewed by media outlets.

Remakes 
Even before the theatrical release of the film, producer Dil Raju acquired the rights for adapting the film in Telugu-language, under his Sri Venkateswara Creations banner. Nani, who watched the preview show of the film, left emotional and decided to sign for the remake as an actor and co-producer, and was reported to be paired opposite Samantha Ruth Prabhu. Prem Kumar, who helmed the original version was also reported to direct the remake. Though, Nani did not act in the film, the makers decided to rope in multiple actors before finalizing Sharwanand as the male lead. Titled Jaanu (2020) Prem Kumar retained the technicians who worked in the original film, which released worldwide on 7 February 2020. 96 was remade in Kannada by Preetham Gubbi as 99 (2019), with Ganesh and Bhavana reprising the roles played by Sethupathi and Trisha in the original. In September 2021, Ajay Kapoor announced a Hindi remake of the film, while also acquiring the rights of the original.

Even a Punjabi movie Lekh(2022) seem to be inspired from this movie as in this movie too, two sweet hearts separated after 10th  meet again. But in this movie the ending is different and presented as positive.

Rumoured sequel 
In February 2022, reports have been surfaced that Prem Kumar had developed the idea for a sequel which could be materialised, and Vijay Sethupathi and Trisha reported to reprise their characters from the original. Contradicting the reports, Kumar had claimed that no such sequel is in the offering.

Notes

References

External links 
 

2018 films
2010s Tamil-language films
2018 romantic drama films
Indian romantic drama films
Indian nonlinear narrative films
Films involved in plagiarism controversies
Films scored by Govind Vasantha
Films set in 1996
Films set in Chennai
Films shot in Chennai
Films shot in Kolkata
Films shot in Rajasthan
Films shot in Puducherry
Tamil films remade in other languages
2018 directorial debut films
Films about travel
Indian coming-of-age films
Films set in schools
Films set in universities and colleges